The North Carolina Tar Heels men's soccer team represents the University of North Carolina at Chapel Hill in men's NCAA Division I soccer competition. They compete in the Atlantic Coast Conference. The Tar Heels won the NCAA championship in 2001 and 2011.

History 

The UNC men's varsity soccer team was founded in 1947 by Dr. Marvin Allen, the team's first coach. Before the team had only been at the club level. Dr. Allen led the team until 1977 when the current UNC women's soccer team coach Anson Dorrance took over. Dorrance spent 12 successful seasons with the men's team until 1988. One of the main reasons for his retirement from the men's team was to focus on the women's program, which he had begun coaching while he was the men's coach. Dorrance led the Tar Heel's to their first ACC Tournament Championship in the tournament's inaugural year, 1987. 

Elmar Bolowich took the reins from Dorrance and led the team to a National Championship in 2001, the first of the program. Bolowich resigned in 2011, and the former assistant coach, and current head coach, Carlos Somoano was hired. In his first year as head coach, Somoano won the 2011 national championship, a feat only accomplished by one other coach, Indiana's Mike Freitag. The same year, he also won the ACC regular season, and the ACC Tournament, winning every title possible for the year. Since the programs founding in 1947, Carolina has posted only 2 losing seasons. Making 4 consecutive College Cup appearances from 2008 to 2011, UNC has established itself as a powerhouse in modern-day college soccer in one of the most dominant conferences in the country.

Current roster

Facilities

Fetzer Field
Fetzer Field was originally built in 1935 as a part of president Franklin D. Roosevelt's Works Project Administration, which brought much needed jobs to native Tar Heels. It was originally constructed for the track and field team, named after a previous UNC athletic director, Bob Fetzer. However, Fetzer Field soon served home to men's soccer in 1947, men's lacrosse in 1949, women's soccer in 1979, and women's lacrosse in 1996. It has also served as a site for numerous men's and women's lacrosse and soccer ACC Championship events, National Junior Olympic events, and as the home training site for the U.S. Track and Field Team in 1996.  In 2017 Fetzer Field was demolished to make way for Dorrance Field.

McCaskill Soccer Center
Located right next to Fetzer Field, the McCaskill Soccer Center serves multiple functions for Tar Heel men's and women's soccer. It holds the offices of both men's and women's coaches and a meeting room on the second level, complete with a deck. On the first level there are the men's and women's team locker rooms, as well as a team meeting room. Named after long time Tar Heel supporters, the McCaskill family, the McCaskill Soccer Center has been in use since 1999.

National Championship NCAA Tournament overviews

2001
The 2001 NCAA Division I Men's Soccer Championship was the first national title that the men's soccer team had earned. The road to the championship game saw the #7 seeded Tar Heel's defeat #3 seeded Stanford by a score of 3–2 in overtime of the semifinals. That moved the tar heels along to the National Championship game against #4 seeded Indiana. The game would be won 2–0 by the Tar Heels in regular time with goals from Ryan Kneipper and Danny Jackson. When asked about the game, Coach Bolowich said, "I thought David- as well as our entire defense – played a fantastic game and the team effort was there". The team's record of 21–4 saw the program claim its first national title.

2011
The 2011 NCAA Division I Men's Soccer Championship was the second national title the men's soccer team had earned. During the course of the tournament, the #1 seeded Tar Heels defeated Coastal Carolina (3–2), Indiana (1–0 in OT), and Saint Mary's (2–0) respectively, to reach the College Cup. In the semifinal, the Tar Heels faced #13 seeded UCLA, and would win the game 2–1, by way of a penalty kick shootout (3–1). Carolina faced the unseeded Charlotte 49ers in the final, winning the game 1–0 on a second-half Ben Speas goal. Team captain, Kirk Urso, who died due to a congenital heart defect at age 22, said in an interview after the game "My whole college career has been awesome, but there was something extra about this team. To cap it off with this is something I'm going to remember the rest of my life." A final record of 21–2–3 illustrates what a special year the Tar Heels had.

Rivalries

Duke
The North Carolina vs. Duke rivalry is considered to be one of the greatest rivalry in the history of sports. That doesn't change when the two schools meet on the soccer field. Rated the No. 5 greatest rivalries in the history of college soccer by College Soccer News, this matchup not only has conference ramifications, but also Carlyle Cup ramifications, a trophy in which the two schools compete against each other yearly, encompassing all sports.

Current coaches

Carlos Somoano
Coach Somoano was hired as the head coach in 2011 after serving as an assistant to Elmar Bolowich since 2001. Somoano led the team to the 2011 National Championship and was also named National Coach of the Year. During his time away from Carolina Somoano also works with the Capital Area Soccer League youth club. Since 2002 he has contributed to the youth development by being a scout for the U.S. Soccer Development Academy. In his college career as a player at Eckerd College, he earned four letters, and was team captain twice, while he majored Biology with a concentration in pre-med. Somoano was inducted into the Eckerd College Athletics Hall of Fame in 2013. His previous jobs include an assistant at Virginia Commonwealth University from 1996 to 2001, and an assistant at Eckerd College from 1992 to 1995.

Jeff Negalha

Jeff Negalha joined the team in 2005 as an assistant coach under Elmar Bolowich, and currently holds the assistant position under Carlos Somoano. Negalha was instrumental in the 2011 National Championship year, winning the NSCAA assistant coach of the year award. He is a key part of the recruiting process, helping bring the No. 1 ranked class in 2011. Prior to his career at Carolina Negalha served as the assistant coach for the USC Spartanburg from 1999 to 2002, which is his alma mater.

Grant Porter
Grant Porter is a current assistant coach and former UNC men's soccer player from 2000 to 2003. He was a key part of the 2001 national title, the first ever for the program. He was hired in 2011 and helped the team to the National title the same year. Before Carolina, Porter served as an assistant coach for UC Santa Barbara in 2005. From 2006 to 2011 he served as the Director of Soccer for Charlotte United Football Club in Charlotte, NC.

Season awards

Kirk Urso Heart Award
Due to the death of Kirk Urso in 2012 from a congenital heart defect, the team, as of 2012, votes on the "individual that most embodies Urso's selflessness and tireless work ethic." Urso was a midfielder for the Columbus Crew at the time of his death.

2012– Jordan Gafa

2013– Verneri Valimaa

Tom Evins Jr. Most Improved Player Award
This award is presented to the player who has improved the most over the course of the previous year. Tom Evins Jr. is a former player and letterman from the class of 1961.

2012– Boyd Okwuonu

2013– Brendan Moore

Mercer Reynolds "Tar Heel" Award
This award is given to a player who exemplifies characteristics of what it means to be a Tar Heel student-athlete on the field, in the classroom and in the community.
 2012 – David Walden
 2013 – Alex Walters

Mike Thompson Most Valuable Player Award
This award goes to the player who is voted most valuable by his teammates. Mike Thompson was a former player, captain, and letterman that graduated in 1959.

2012– Boyd Okwuonu

2013– Jonathon Campbell

Nicholas Douglass Potter Coaches Award
This award is given to the "player who comes to practice and games everyday seeking to get better and is also a coachable player that helps to improve others around him." Nicholas Douglass Potter is an avid supporter of the men's soccer team and of UNC Athletics as a whole.

2012– Scott Goodwin

2013– Boyd Okwuonu

All time-record

Notable alumni

Eddie Pope
Eddie Pope played for the Tar Heels from 1992 to 1995. In 1994 he earned a spot on the first team All-American squad, as well as All-ACC and All-South Region honors. Pope was a key member of the Tar Heels' defensive line, who started every game of his college career. He also held the position of place kicker as a freshman for the UNC Football team, but choose to focus on soccer. Pope was eventually selected second overall in the MLS College Draft by D.C. United. He is a notable alumni member of the Tar Heel's men's soccer because of his induction to the North Carolina Soccer Hall of Fame, his 82 appearances and 8 goals for the USA full national team, and his charity The Eddie Pope Foundation.

Kirk Urso
Kirk Urso was a member of the men's soccer program from 2008 to 2011, where he captained the team to the 2011 National Championship. He was drafted #10 in the 2012 MLS Supplemental Draft by the Columbus Crew in Ohio. Urso died of a congenital heart defect on August 5, 2012, after he had recorded 6 appearances with 5 starts for the Crew. Urso is a notable alumnus of the program because of the contribution that he gave to the team day in and day out. The Kirk Urso Heart Award is now given in his honor. Current head coach Somoano said "He's still remembered in our program, and always will be." The Columbus Crew have created The Kirk Urso Fund, "which supports research and programming focused on congenital heart defects and sudden cardiac death in youth."

Gregg Berhalter
Gregg Berhalter played at UNC from 1991 to 1994 under Elmar Bolowich. He left after his junior year to turn professional and signed for the Dutch club Zwolle. He spent a period abroad until returning to the US to play for the LA Galaxy in 2009. When he retired from his playing career in 2011, he also opened his managerial career by becoming the head coach at Hammarby IF in Sweden. He coached former player Billy Schuler, a member of the 2011 National Championship team, at Hammarby If. In 2013 Berhalter became the head coach of the Columbus Crew. He is a notable alumnus of the program because of his many years as a professional, and he is also the first American to manage a professional soccer team in Europe. In late 2018, Berhalter was hired as the United States Men's National team coach.

Ben Speas
Ben Speas was a member of the Tar Heel's during the 2011 season only, after transferring from Akron University. He scored the winning goal in the 2011 National Championship game; giving the Tar Heels its second national title. He also was named the NCAA College Cup MVP after the final game. He was also a key member of the 2011 team, who made 25 starts in 26 games. Speas played a major role for the Tar Heels championship.

References

External links

 

 
1947 establishments in North Carolina
Association football clubs established in 1947